Bose Venkat  is an Indian actor, director and dubbing artist who appears in Tamil films and television serials.

Personal life
Venkat is married to actress Sonia in 2003. The couple have a son Tejaswin and a daughter Bavadarani

Career
Venkat came to Chennai at the age of 17, hoping to become an actor in films. After facing an unsuccessful start to his career, he worked briefly as an auto rickshaw driver while attending auditions. He subsequently got selected for a role in the serial Metti Oli. Recognising his work in the serial, director Bharathiraja offered him a role in Eera Nilam (2003).  He was also part of the 2005 Tamil film, Kannammaunder the direction of S. S. Baba Vikram. He has also acted in a few Malayalam movies alongside Mammootty and Dileep. 

He says his best experience was acting with Superstar Rajinikanth in the Tamil action-thriller film, Sivaji under the direction of S. Shankar in 2007. Although he played a negative role alongside Suman, his performance was showered with praises from all over. Bose has essayed pivotal roles in movies like Marudhamalai (2007),  Dhaam Dhoom (2008), Saroja (2008), Singam (2010), Ko (2011), Yaamirukka Bayamey (2014), 36 Vayadhinile (2015), Kavan (2017) and Theeran Adhigaram Ondru (2017).

He made his debut as a director with Kanni Maadam (2020).

Filmography

Actor

Tamil films

Malayalam films

Kannada films

Director

Voice actor

Television

Web series

References

External links
 

1975 births
Living people
Tamil male actors
Tamil male television actors
Television personalities from Tamil Nadu
Male actors from Chennai
Male actors in Tamil cinema
21st-century Tamil male actors